The Beijing International Challenge (also known as BTV Cup) was a professional non-ranking snooker tournament organised by 110 Sport. The last champion was Tian Pengfei.

History 
The event was first held in 2009, organised by 110 Sport Management Group. It took place at the Beijing University Students' Gymnasium in Beijing, China.  The even is organised on a round robin basis, and the top two players in the groups advance to the semi-finals.

Winners

References

 
Recurring sporting events established in 2009
Recurring events disestablished in 2010
2009 establishments in China
2010 disestablishments in China
Snooker non-ranking competitions
Snooker competitions in China
Defunct snooker competitions
Defunct sports competitions in China
Sports competitions in Beijing